Karstenia is a genus of fungi in the order Rhytismatales. The relationship of this taxon to other taxa within the order is unknown (incertae sedis), and it has not yet been placed with certainty into any family.

The genus name of Karstenia is in honour of Petter Adolf Karsten (1834–1917), who was a Finnish born mycologist.

The genus was circumscribed by Elias Magnus Fries in Acta Soc. Fauna Fl. Fenn. vol.2 (issue 6) on page 166 in 1885.

Species
Karstenia clematidis (W.Phillips) Sherwood 1980 – Great Britain
Karstenia corticoides (Pat.) Sherwood 1977
Karstenia gregaria Graddon 1986 – Great Britain
Karstenia idaei (Fuckel) Sherwood 1977
Karstenia inconspicua Wilberf. 1999
Karstenia lonicerae (Velen.) Sherwood 1977
Karstenia macer (P.Karst.) Sherwood 1980
Karstenia maydis (Rehm) Sherwood 1980
Karstenia rubicola (Ellis & Dearn.) Sherwood 1980
Karstenia sorbina (P.Karst.) P.Karst. 1885

References

Leotiomycetes genera
Leotiomycetes